A concentrated disadvantage is a sociological term for neighborhoods with high percentages of residents of low socioeconomic status. It is expressed as the percent of households located in census tracts with high levels of concentrated disadvantage.

Associations and effects
Concentrated disadvantage has been found to be positively related to homicide rates and reduces probability of high school completion. A positive association between concentrated disadvantage and rates of violence more generally has also been found; this relationship is mediated primarily by collective efficacy. There is also evidence that juvenile court officials perceive more disadvantaged neighborhoods as more dangerous, and so are less likely to release youth from such neighborhoods into their communities. Child development is enhanced the most in neighborhoods with approximately equal amounts of concentrated disadvantage and affluence.

Calculation
According to one formula, concentrated disadvantage is calculated based on five metrics. These metrics are:
Percent of individuals below the povertyline
Percent of individuals on public assistance 
Percent female-headed households, 
Percent unemployed, and
Percent less than age 18. Another measure of concentrated disadvantage is based on "welfare receipt, poverty, unemployment, female-headed households, racial composition (percentage black), and density of children."

References

Sociological terminology
Poverty